Darren Dixon is an English former professional motorcycle racer.

Originally a sidecar racer, he scored his first win at Lydden Circuit in 1981 in the 'B' final with a new passenger, Terry McGahan. They stayed together through 1982 and scored 38 wins together including a lap record at Brands Hatch which stood until 1991. After an astounding rise through club  racing finances meant his sidecar promise would be put on hold and he took to solo racing and quickly climbed the ranks to become a top national level solo racer. He won the British F1 Championship in 1988 on a Suzuki RG500 and made two 500cc Grand Prix appearances. His greatest achievement was winning the Sidecar World Championship in 1995 and 1996. Dixon later went on to manage a Superbike team. Darren is the father of 2018 second placed British Superbike rider, and current Moto2 rider Jake Dixon.

References

External links
Pics of Darren Dixon racing 

Living people
English motorcycle racers
Sidecar racers
500cc World Championship riders
Year of birth missing (living people)